The 2007–08 Irish League Cup (known as the CIS Insurance Cup for sponsorship reasons) was the 22nd edition of Northern Ireland's secondary football knock-out cup competition. It concluded on 2 February 2008 with the final.

Glentoran were the defending champions after their sixth League Cup win last season; a 1–0 victory over Cliftonville in the previous final. This season Glentoran went out at the semi-final stage to Crusaders, who were then defeated 3–2 by Linfield in the final. This was a record ninth League Cup win for Linfield, and would be their last one for 11 years until they won the 2019 final. This was also the tenth time in eleven years that the cup had been won by one of Belfast's Big Two.

The 16 clubs taking part were divided into four groups of four clubs. The clubs in each group played each other at home and away. The top two clubs from each group then advanced to the quarter-finals where they played a single knock-out tie against another quarter-finalist. The semi-finals were played in the same format with the two winners of the ties advancing to the single match final.

Group stage

Group A

Group B

Group C

Group D

Quarter-finals

Semi-finals

Final

References

Lea
2007–08 domestic association football cups
2007-08